Rima Brayley is a sinuous rille on the moon, centered on selenographic coordinates 22.3°N 36.35°W.  It crosses from Oceanus Procellarum in the west, passes close to the north rim of Brayley crater, and passes into Mare Imbrium in the east.  The name of the feature was approved by the IAU in 1985.

References

External links
LTO-39C1, Brayley

LQ04 quadrangle
LQ10 quadrangle
LQ11 quadrangle
Mare Imbrium
Geological features on the Moon